Tamizhuku En Ondrai Azhuthavum (also referred to as TEOA) is a 2015 Indian Tamil-language thriller film written and directed by Ramprakash Rayappa. Produced by V. Chandran, the film stars Nakul, Attakathi Dinesh, Bindu Madhavi and Aishwarya Dutta. The film received positive reviews from critics.

Plot
A deadly bomb will be activated if a computer geek restores a part of Chennai city's mobile networks, which are down due to a solar flare. Four people are linked to each other on a deadly mission.

Mukil falls in love with Simi, who is stuck in a pit hole with an 80-tonne gigantic 'Vaasthu' rock under suspension which is ready to fall on her at any time. The only way that Simi can escape from this danger is if her text message reaches Mukil.

In the meantime, there is a hyperactive science geek Vasanth, who is on a mission to activate a dead mobile network signal. Vasanth Loves a girl Harini. then there is a call taxi driver Raja, whose car has a remotely operated bomb planted in it by a terrorist outfit waiting to destroy the city once the phone lines are restored. Does the city escape destruction from the bomb and what happens with the four main characters forms the rest of the story.

Cast

 Nakul as Vasanth
 Aishwarya Dutta as Harini
 Dinesh as Mukil
 Bindu Madhavi as Simi
 Urvashi as Vasanth's mother
 Manobala as Swaminathan
 Sathish as Raja
 Md Asif as Bunty
 Ajay as Ramesh
 Baby Roshini as Shruti
 Sundari Divya as Lavanya
 Shalu Shamu as Maha
 Balachandar as Sanjay
 A. Srepaty Parvatraj as Seenu
 Pradeep K Vijayan as Veerasena
 Vanaraj as cameraman
 Parotta Murukesh as Maha's father
 Subhashini Kannan as Vasanth's sister-in-law

Production
VLS Rock Cinema, who had made Naan Rajavaga Pogiren (2013), announced that they had signed actors Nakul, Attakathi Dinesh and Sathish to be a part of a film directed by Ramprakash Rayappa in October 2013. Actresses Bindu Madhavi and Aishwarya Dutta were signed on to play leading female roles in the film. the film began production in December 2013 and the team held a series of workshops to help the actors get into character, before beginning filming in Tiruvottiyur.

Soundtrack
The soundtrack was composed by S. Thaman, and the lyrics were written by Madhan Karky and Yugabharathi.

Release
The satellite rights of the film were sold to STAR Vijay.

Critical reception
M. Suganth of The Times of India's gave the film 3.5 stars out of 5 and wrote, "Ramprakash Rayappa sets up his story effectively and keeps us on the edge of our seats for the most parts. The manner in which he handles this multi-strand narrative without making it chaotic deserves appreciation. The success lies in how he makes each of these sub-plots interesting", going on to call it a "solid debut film". Indo-Asian News Service, while giving the same rating and also describing it as a "solid social thriller", wrote, "(the) details, though minute, make the director stand out from his contemporaries. The writing is fresh and it’s evident from the way the director manages to make the parallelly running stories converge at the end...It’s probably the first Tamil film where a perfect balance is struck between science, romance and comedy interspersed with some fresh thrills". The New Indian Express wrote, "The deftness and confidence with which the director moves his narration belies the fact that this is his debut venture. The screenplay is engaging, with the characters well-fleshed out, and there is an element of suspense with humour laced throughout...One of the better scripts to appear in recent times, Thamizhuku Enn Ondrai Azhuthavum has a lot of positives going for it". Sify wrote, "The director has done his paper work with sheer perfection and packaged this out-of-the-box concept in a fairly engaging manner". Baradwaj Rangan wrote, "It doesn’t say much about a movie when we walk into a thriller and walk out of what’s mostly a comedy – but with so many laughs, why complain?", further adding that "first-time director Ramprakash Rayappa at least has the right ideas".

In contrast, Rediff gave the film 2 stars out of 5 and wrote, "Director Ramprakash has come up with a good idea, but the performance is poor, the romance seems forced, there are too many coincidences and a lame, predictable climax. This spoils what could have been a racy and exciting thriller".

References

External links
 

2010s Tamil-language films
2015 films
2015 directorial debut films
Hyperlink films
2010s science fiction thriller films
Indian science fiction thriller films
Films about energy
Films about computing
Films about security and surveillance
Films about mobile phones
Films about terrorism in India
Films scored by Thaman S